Henry's Island is an island near Bakkhali in South 24 Parganas of West Bengal, India.

References

Tourist attractions in South 24 Parganas district
Geography of South 24 Parganas district
Islands of West Bengal
Uninhabited islands of India
Islands of India
Islands of the Bay of Bengal